The Dapeng LNG is China's first Liquefied Natural Gas (LNG) terminal.  Guangdong Dapeng LNG Company ltd. was established in February 2004.

See also 

 List of LNG terminals

External links
GDLNG website

References 

Liquefied natural gas terminals
Energy infrastructure in China
2004 establishments in China
Dapeng New District